Berruguete is a surname. Notable people with the surname include:

 Alonso Berruguete ( 1488–1561), Spanish painter
 Pedro Berruguete ( 1450–1504), Spanish painter, father of Alonso